Lake Huron is one of the five Great Lakes of North America. It is shared on the north and east by the Canadian province of Ontario and on the south and west by the U.S. state of Michigan. The name of the lake is derived from early French explorers who named it for the Huron people inhabiting the region.

The Huronian glaciation was named from evidence collected from Lake Huron region.  The northern parts of the lake include the North Channel and Georgian Bay.  Saginaw Bay is located in the southwest corner of the lake.  The main inlet is the St. Marys River, and the main outlet is the St. Clair River.

Geography
By surface area, Lake Huron is the second-largest of the Great Lakes, with a surface area of —of which  lies in Michigan and  lies in Ontario—making it the third-largest fresh water lake on Earth (or the fourth-largest lake, if the Caspian Sea is counted as a lake). By volume however, Lake Huron is only the third largest of the Great Lakes, being surpassed by Lake Michigan and Lake Superior.

A large bay that protrudes northeast from Lake Huron into Ontario, Canada, is called Georgian Bay. A notable feature of the lake is Manitoulin Island, which separates the North Channel and Georgian Bay from Lake Huron's main body of water. It is the world's largest lake island. A smaller bay that protrudes southwest from Lake Huron into Michigan is called Saginaw Bay.

Cities with over 10,000 people on Lake Huron include Sarnia, the largest city on Lake Huron, and Saugeen Shores in Canada and Bay City, Port Huron, and Alpena in the United States. Major centres on Georgian Bay include Owen Sound, Wasaga Beach, Collingwood, Midland, Penetanguishene, Port Severn and Parry Sound.

Water levels

Historic high water
The lake fluctuates from month to month with the highest lake levels in October and November. The high-water records were broken for several months in a row in 2020.

Historic low water
Lake levels tend to be the lowest in winter. As with the high-water records, monthly low-water records were set each month from February 1964 through January 1965. The all-time low-water mark was eclipsed in January 2013.

Geology

Lake Huron has the largest shore line length of any of the Great Lakes, counting its 30,000 islands. Lake Superior, at 21 feet higher elevation, drains into the St. Marys River which then flows into Lake Huron. The water then flows south to the St. Clair River, at Port Huron, Michigan and Sarnia, Ontario. The Great Lakes Waterway continues thence to Lake St. Clair; the Detroit River and Detroit, Michigan; into Lake Erie and thence – via Lake Ontario and the St. Lawrence River – to the Atlantic Ocean.

Like the other Great Lakes, it was formed by melting ice as the continental glaciers retreated toward the end of the last ice age. Before this, Lake Huron was a low-lying depression through which flowed the now-buried Laurentian and Huronian Rivers; the lake bed was criss-crossed by a large network of tributaries to these ancient waterways, with many of the old channels still evident on bathymetric maps.

The Alpena-Amberley Ridge is an ancient ridge beneath the surface of Lake Huron, running from Alpena, Michigan, southwest to Point Clark, Ontario.

History

That land bridge was used as a migration route for large herds of caribou. Since 2008, archaeologists have discovered at least 60 stone constructions along the submerged ridge that are thought to have been used as hunting blinds by Paleo-Indians. That a trade network brought obsidian from Oregon almost ten thousand years ago to be used for toolmaking was confirmed by a 2013 underwater discovery along the ridge. 

On the eve of European contact, the extent of development among Eastern Woodlands Native American societies is indicated by the archaeological evidence of a town on or near Lake Huron that contained more than one hundred large structures housing a total population of between 4,000 and 6,000. The French, the first European visitors to the region, often referred to Lake Huron as La Mer Douce, "the fresh-water sea". In 1656, a map by French cartographer Nicolas Sanson refers to the lake by the name , a Wyandot word that has been translated variously, as "Freshwater Sea", "Lake of the Hurons", or simply "lake". Generally, the lake was labeled "Lac des Hurons" (Lake of the Huron) on most early European maps. 

By the 1860s, many European settlements on the shores of Lake Huron were becoming incorporated, including Sarnia, the largest city on Lake Huron. On October 26, 2010, the Karegnondi Water Authority was formed to build and manage a pipeline from the lake to Flint, Michigan.

Shipwrecks

More than a thousand wrecks have been recorded in Lake Huron. Of these, 185 are located in Saginaw Bay, and 116 are found in the  Thunder Bay National Marine Sanctuary and Underwater Preserve, which was established in 2000. Georgian Bay contains 212 sunken vessels.

Purportedly the first European vessel to sail the Great Lakes, Le Griffon, also became the first ship lost on the Great Lakes. Built in 1679 on the eastern shore of Lake Erie near Buffalo, New York. Robert Cavalier, Sieur de la Salle navigated across Lake Erie, up the Detroit River, Lake St. Clair and the St. Clair River out into Lake Huron. Passing the Straits of Mackinac, La Salle made landfall on Washington Island, off the tip of the Door Peninsula on the Wisconsin side of Lake Michigan. La Salle filled Le Griffon with pelts and in late November 1679 sent Le Griffon back to the site of modern-day Buffalo, never to be seen again. Two wrecks have been identified as Le Griffon, although neither has gained final verification as the actual wreck. Blown by a fierce storm after leaving, Le Griffon ran aground before the storm. The people of Manitoulin Island say that the wreck in Mississagi Strait at the western tip of the island is that of Le Griffon. Meanwhile, others near Tobermory, say that the wreck on Russell Island,  farther east in Georgian Bay, is that of Le Griffon.

Storm of 1913 

On November 9, 1913, the Great Lakes Storm of 1913 in Lake Huron sank 10 ships, and more than 20 were driven ashore.  The storm, which raged for 16 hours, killed 235 seamen.

Matoa—a propeller freighter weighing 2,311 gross register tons—had passed between Port Huron, Michigan, and Sarnia, Ontario, just after midnight. On November 9, just after six in the morning, Senator pushed upstream. Less than an hour later, Manola—a propeller freighter of 2,325 gross register tons also built in Cleveland in 1890—passed through. Captain Frederick W. Light of Manola reported that both the Canadian and the American weather stations had storm flag signals flying from their weather towers. Following behind at 7:00 a.m. that Sunday, Regina steamed out of Sarnia into the northwest gale. The warnings had been up for four hours. Manola passed Regina off Port Sanilac,  up the lake. Captain Light determined that if it continued to deteriorate, he would seek shelter at Harbor Beach, Michigan, another  up the lake. There, he could seek shelter behind the breakwater. Before he reached Harbor Beach, the winds turned to the northeast and the lake began to rise. It was noon when he reached Harbor Beach and ran for shelter. 

The waves were so violent that Manola touched bottom entering the harbor. With help from a tugboat, Manola tied up to the break wall with eight lines. It was about 3:00 p.m. when Manola was secured and the crew prepared to drop anchor. As they worked, the cables began to snap from wind pressure against the hull. To keep from being pushed aground, they kept their bow into the wind with the engines running half to full in turns, yet the ship still drifted  before its movement was arrested. Waves breaking over the ship damaged several windows, and the crew reported seeing portions of the concrete break wall peeling off as the waves struck it. Meanwhile, fifty miles farther up the lake, Matoa and Captain Hugh McLeod had to ride out the storm without a safe harbor. Matoa was found stranded on the Port Austin reef when the winds subsided. 

It was noon on Monday before the winds let up and not until 11:00 p.m. that night before Captain Light determined it to be safe to continue his journey. Although Manola survived the storm, she was renamed Mapledawn in 1920, and on November 24, 1924, she became stranded on Christian Island in Georgian Bay. It was declared a total loss. Salvagers were able to recover approximately 75,000 bushels of barley.

Ecology

Lake Huron has a lake retention time of 22 years. Like all of the Great Lakes, the ecology of Lake Huron has undergone drastic changes in the last century. The lake originally supported a native deepwater fish community dominated by lake trout, which fed on several species of ciscos as well as sculpins and other native fishes. Several invasive species, including sea lamprey, alewife and rainbow smelt, became abundant in the lake by the 1930s. The major native top predator, lake trout, was virtually extirpated from the lake by 1950 through a combination of overfishing and the effects of sea lamprey. Several species of ciscos were also extirpated from the lake by the 1960s; the only remaining native cisco is the bloater. Non-native Pacific salmon have been stocked in the lake since the 1960s, and lake trout have also been stocked in an attempt to rehabilitate the species, although little natural reproduction of stocked trout has been observed.

Lake Huron has suffered recently by the introduction of a variety of new invasive species, including zebra and quagga mussels, the spiny water flea, and round gobies.  The demersal fish community of the lake was in a state of collapse by 2006, and a number of drastic changes have been observed in the zooplankton community of the lake. Chinook salmon catches have also been greatly reduced in recent years, and lake whitefish have become less abundant and are in poor condition. These recent changes may be attributable to the new exotic species.

See also

 Drummond Island
 Hurricane Huron
 Les Cheneaux Islands
 Mackinac Island
 Manitoulin Island
 Michigan lighthouses
 Shipwrecks of the 1913 Great Lakes storm and List of victims of the 1913 Great Lakes storm

Great Lakes in general

 Great Lakes Areas of Concern
 Great Lakes census statistical areas
 Great Lakes Commission
 Great Recycling and Northern Development Canal
 International Boundary Waters Treaty
 List of cities along the Great Lakes
 Seiche
 Sixty Years' War for control of the Great Lakes
 Third Coast
 Snowbelt

Notes

External links

 
 NOAA chart #14860 (Lake Huron)
 EPA's Great Lakes Atlas
 Fish Species of Lake Huron
 Great Lakes Coast Watch
 Lake Huron Binational Partnership Action Plan
 Lake Huron Data
 Lake Huron GIS
 Michigan DNR map of Lake Huron
 Bathymetry of Lake Huron
 In the Depths of Lake Huron, Secrets of an Ancient Sea

Lighthouses
 Interactive map of lighthouses, Georgian Bay, Lake Huron
 Interactive map of lighthouses in North and East Lake Huron
 Interactive map of lighthouses in North and West Lake Huron

 
Huron, Lake
Huron
Huron
Canada–United States border
Huron
Huron